Pyrotol is a catalyst used in the industrial production of benzene through a process known as pyrolysis.  It is a proprietary chromium-alumina catalyst manufactured by Clariant International (formerly known as Sud-Chemie) and licensed exclusively to CB&I Lummus Technology, Inc.  It is completely unrelated to the explosive pyrotol.

External links
 Clariant - Catalysis and Energy
 Detol, Litol, and Pyrotol Hydrodealkylation

Catalysts